Atlantis is a town in the Western Cape province of South Africa and is  north of the Cape Town. As of 2011, it has 67,491 residents.  Unemployment, lack of housing and crime are major challenges in the area.

History of Atlantis

The suburb of Atlantis was established during the 1970s by the Apartheid government as an industrial centre and a community for the coloured population of Cape Town under the Group Areas Act.  In order to attract industry and residents to Atlantis the government introduced various incentives to attract manufacturing firms via a system of relocation tax credit. In its heyday in the early to mid-1980s there were approximately 50 industrialists in Atlantis employing people drawn from nearly 8 000 households. These industries included large manufacturing concerns such as Tedelex and Atlantis Diesel Engines.

Manufacturing activities in Atlantis declined with the termination of the incentive programmes and the defence manufacturing contracts from the mid-1980s. The withdrawal of incentives significantly reduced the attractiveness of the area and while Atlantis has since been through a series of mini economic booms and busts the trend declined in the economy of the area.
 
Currently, only about 3% of the original companies still have business in Atlantis but numerous new factories and businesses have started to operate in Atlantis. Over the past three years over R1bn has been invested into Atlantis by large multinationals. Hisense opened a factory in the town in June 2013[2] injecting ZAR 350 million into the first phase of the Atlantis plant, creating 300 production positions and accompanied by a skills-transfer programme led by technicians and engineers from China.

Over R600m has been invested by the green manufacturing industry, for the manufacture of wind towers, wind tower internals and solar panels and the like. The investment is the result of cooperation between the City of Cape Town, the Western Cape Government, the South African Department of Trade and Industry and GreenCape. In 2013, the City of Cape Town in cooperation with the Western Cape Provincial Government declared Atlantis as a priority area for economic development, establishing a Greentech hub for manufacturing of components for the renewable energy and other green industries. An application has also been submitted for the Atlantis Industrial Area to be declared a Special Economic Zone with the focus on green technology. The SEZ status will provide investors a range of incentives, including the benefits of co-location, and access to established markets.

There have been a range of other interventions to revitalize the local economy:

 Upgrading of infrastructure such as the electricity supply, improved public transport system (MyCiti Bus System), installation of a fiber optic network to improve the broad band utilization and load shedding curtailment agreements.
 A special package of investment incentives for Atlantis, which comprises fast-tracking of building plan approval and land use applications, the waiver of building plan scrutiny fees, reduced electricity tariffs for large electricity users, partial waiver of development contributions, as well as the establishment of an Investment Facilitation Office in Atlantis. Through these initiatives, it is now easier to do business in Atlantis and the cost of doing has been driven down.

The biggest new investment is the GRI South Africa factory which manufactures wind turbine towers, the investment is about R400m and created 230 new jobs. Currently, there are 94 factories and 77 services businesses in Atlantis.

See also
Atlantis Diesel Engines

References

Populated places in the City of Cape Town
1970s establishments in South Africa